Seydouba Soumah (born 11 June 1991) is a Guinean professional footballer who plays as an attacking midfielder for Guinea national team.

Club career

Ajax Cape Town
Born in Conakry, Guinea, Soumah began his football career playing on the streets, before moving to South Africa and joining the youth system of Ajax Cape Town as a teenager. He was initially sent out on season-long loans to National First Division sides Ikapa Sporting (2008–09) and FC Cape Town (2009–10), before returning to his parent club.

On 21 January 2011, Soumah made his debut for Ajax in the Premier Soccer League, coming off the bench in a 3–0 away victory against Platinum Stars. He scored his first goal in a 2–1 home win over Mpumalanga Black Aces on 6 March. In total, Soumah made 10 appearances in the 2010–11 season, as the club finished as runners-up.

In September 2011, Soumah moved to National First Division side University of Pretoria. He bagged two goals in the first half of 2011–12 season. In January 2012, Tuks manager Steve Barker revealed that Soumah parted ways with the club.

Nitra
In February 2012, Soumah arrived to Europe and signed a three-year contract with Slovak club Nitra. He scored two times until the end of the 2011–12 season. On 14 September 2012, Soumah received a red card in a 3–1 home league loss to Spartak Trnava, alongside two other teammates. He was later fined €3,400 and banned from football for six months for making an obscene gesture towards fans, assaulting the opponent's players and threatening the referee during that match.

Slovan Bratislava
In December 2012, Soumah was transferred to fellow Slovak club Slovan Bratislava for a fee of €150,000. He signed a long-term contract and was given the number 20 shirt. Through the remainder of the season, Soumah made 13 appearances and won the double. He also helped the club win the second title in a row in the 2013–14 season, scoring two goals in 21 games. In July 2014, Soumah celebrated by lifting the Slovak Super Cup trophy after Slovan beat MFK Košice 1–0.

In July 2015, Soumah moved to Kuwait Premier League side Qadsia on a season-long loan. He netted seven league goals to help the club win the 2015–16 title. Soumah also made two appearances in the 2015 AFC Cup, scoring one goal.

Following his loan spell at Qadsia, Soumah returned to Slovan and by the end of November 2016 had extended his contract with the club until the summer of 2020. He would become the league's joint top scorer in the 2016–17 season, alongside Filip Hlohovský, with 20 goals. Soumah also helped the club win the Slovak Cup, scoring the last goal of a 3–0 win over MFK Skalica in the final. He finished the season as the team's top scorer with 25 goals in 39 appearances across all competitions. Due to his performances, Soumah was also named in the league's best eleven.

Partizan
On 18 July 2017, it was announced that Soumah completed his transfer to Serbian club Partizan, making him the club's most expensive signing ever at €1,650 million. He was officially presented on 20 July, penning a three-year contract and receiving the number 20 jersey. Two days later, Soumah made his debut for Partizan as a second-half substitute in an eventual 6–1 home league victory over Mačva Šabac. He scored his first goal for the club on 29 July, helping his team to a 2–1 win versus Javor Ivanjica at home. On 2 August, Soumah scored a goal in a 2–2 away draw with Olympiacos in the return leg of the UEFA Champions League third qualifying round, as Partizan got eliminated 5–3 on aggregate. He later scored in a 4–0 away win over Videoton in the second leg of the UEFA Europa League play-off round, helping the team progress to the group stage. On 13 December, Soumah converted a penalty in a 1–1 home draw with Red Star Belgrade. This was the first penalty awarded to Partizan in the Eternal derby after more than 22 years.

Loan to Maccabi Haifa 
In September 2018, Soumah was loaned to Israeli Premier League side Maccabi Haifa until the end of the season with an option for three more.

Return to Partizan 
After completing his loan spell, Soumah returned to Partizan in 2019 and entered the final year of his contract. He scored the equalizer in an eventual 2–1 home win over Molde in the first leg of the Europa League play-off round.

International career
Soumah made his senior debut for Guinea in a 1–1 friendly draw against Senegal on 5 February 2013. He netted his first national team goal later that year in a 4–2 away loss to Egypt in a 2014 World Cup qualifier.

On 15 November 2014, Soumah scored his first ever hat-trick in a 4–1 away win over Togo in an 2015 AFCON qualifier. He scored two more goals during qualifying, helping his country qualify for the tournament and earning a spot on the final 23-man roster. He appeared in two matches as Guinea progressed through the group stage with three draws but got eliminated in the quarter-finals by Ghana.

In November 2018, Soumah was dropped from the squad for his lack of commitment. He returned to the squad in December 2019 and played for 76 minutes against Namibia on 17 November 2019. In November 2021, he appeared against Guinea-Bissau and Morocco. His most recent appearance was against Rwanda on 3 January 2022.

Career statistics

Club

International

International goals
Scores and results list Guinea's goal tally first.

Honours

Club
Slovan Bratislava
 Slovak Super Liga: 2012–13, 2013–14
 Slovak Cup: 2012–13, 2016–17
 Slovak Super Cup: 2014
Qadsia
 Kuwait Premier League: 2015–16
Partizan
 Serbian Cup: 2017–18

Individual
 Slovak Super Liga Top Scorer: 2016–17
 Slovak Super Liga Top Eleven: 2016–17

References

External links

 
 

2015 Africa Cup of Nations players
Cape Town Spurs F.C. players
Association football midfielders
Expatriate footballers in Israel
Guinean expatriate sportspeople in Israel
Expatriate footballers in Kuwait
Guinean expatriate sportspeople in Kuwait
Expatriate footballers in Serbia
Expatriate footballers in Slovakia
Guinean expatriate sportspeople in Slovakia
Expatriate soccer players in South Africa
Guinean expatriate sportspeople in South Africa
F.C. Cape Town players
FC Nitra players
FK Partizan players
Guinea international footballers
Guinean expatriate footballers
Guinean footballers
Ikapa Sporting F.C. players
Israeli Premier League players
Kuwait Premier League players
Maccabi Haifa F.C. players
National First Division players
Qadsia SC players
Serbian SuperLiga players
ŠK Slovan Bratislava players
Slovak Super Liga players
Sportspeople from Conakry
University of Pretoria F.C. players
1991 births
Living people
2021 Africa Cup of Nations players